The following is the discography of DJ Umek, including albums and singles.

Discography

EPs

2010s
 2015 UMEK, Waka Flocka - Cheezin' /Spinnin' Records
 2014 UMEK, Jay Colin - Burnfire /Spinnin' Records 
 2014 UMEK, Mike Vale - All I Want /1605
 2014 UMEK, Groovebox - Sweet Harmony /Spinnin' Records 
 2013 UMEK, Heartik - Unlock My Synth Vein /1605
 2013 UMEK - Carbon Occasions (Dee Marcus 2k13 Remix) /Pacha Recordings 
 2013 UMEK, Groovebox - Rock It Out /1605
 2013 UMEK - Cvile Mi Jaja /Deeperfect Records 
 2013 UMEK, Siwell - Get Funk /Sphera Records 
 2013 UMEK, DJ Dan - Mighty Wind /Toolroom Records 
 2013 UMEK - Move Around /Great Stuff Rec. 
 2013 UMEK, Groovebox - Cause And Effect /Toolroom Records 
 2013 UMEK - Utopia EP /Renaissance Back Catalog 
 2013 UMEK, Spektre - Klaxon /1605
 2013 UMEK - Love To Dance /Toolroom Records 
 2013 UMEK, Mike Vale - Fluid Feel /Toolroom Records 
 2013 UMEK, Pleasurekraft - Korea /1605
 2013 UMEK, Uto Karem - Eternity /Agile Rec. 
 2013 UMEK - I Need You /1605
 2013 UMEK - Spank! /Spinnin' Records 
 2012 UMEK - Kuzla Prevarantska /1605
 2012 UMEK, Mike Vale - My House /Great Stuff Rec. 
 2012 UMEK, Siwell - You Get Used To All The Madness /1605
 2012 UMEK - 100% Sure /Deeperfect Records 
 2012 UMEK - It Is Simple But It Works Like Fcuk /1605
 2012 UMEK - Corridor To Jungle /Agile Recordings 
 2012 UMEK - Let's Go /Deeperfect Records 
 2012 UMEK, Mike Vale - Chosen EP /Great Stuff Rec. 
 2012 UMEK - One More Sound /Toolroom Records 
 2012 UMEK - Slicing And Dicing EP /1605
 2012 UMEK, Olivier Giacomotto - Wombing EP /Definitive Rec. 
 2012 UMEK - Unclear Mechanics /Toolroom Records 
 2012 UMEK, Mike Vale - Point To Consider /1605
 2012 UMEK - Profile Lost (Djuma Soundsystem Remixes) /SOUNDZ 
 2012 UMEK, Olivier Giacomotto - This Sound /1605
 2012 UMEK - Jack The Groove /Toolroom Records 
 2012 UMEK, Uto Karem - Crossing The Lines /1605
 2012 UMEK - Freak It Out /Spinnin' Records 
 2012 UMEK, Stefano Noferini - Goes On /Deeperfect Records 
 2011 UMEK - Split EP /1605
 2011 UMEK - Falling Up The Stairs /1605
 2011 UMEK, Christian Cambas - Heroes Of The Night /1605
 2011 UMEK, Beltek - Out Of Play /Toolroom Records 
 2011 UMEK - Beograd /1605
 2011 UMEK, Stefano Noferini - Complementary Access /Great Stuff Rec. 
 2011 UMEK - Zagreb EP /1605
 2011 VA - Remixed At 16:05 Volume 2 /1605
 2011 UMEK - Next Turn /Cr2 Records 
 2011 UMEK - Slap (Competition Remixes 2011 ) /1605
 2011 UMEK - Get Sucked /1605
 2011 UMEK, Beltek - Let The Bass Kick /Toolroom Records 
 2011 UMEK - Fenaton 2011 /1605
 2011 UMEK - System Of Rules /1605
 2011 UMEK - Sarajevo /Toolroom Records 
 2011 UMEK, PHNTM - Dead Space /Toolroom Records 
 2011 UMEK, Christian Cambas - On The Edge /1605
2011 UMEK, Martina Zymek - Extreme Beauty Records /1605
 2011 UMEK, Tomy DeClerque - Original Challenge EP /CR2 Records 
 2011 UMEK, Traumer - She Neve Wants To Come Down /1605
 2010 UMEK, PHNTM - Freaks On The Floor /1605
 2010 UMEK - Novi Sad /Great Stuff Rec. 
 2010 UMEK, Jay Lumen - Popgirls /1605
 2010 UMEK - Fire Fight / Ljubljana /Intec Digital 
 2010 UMEK - Gatex 2010 /1605
 2010 UMEK, Beltek - Back In The Race EP /CR2 Records 
 2010 UMEK - Card Gamble /Hotfingers 
 2010 UMEK - Enhance The Tension /1605
 2010 UMEK, Beltek - We Are Not Done Yet /303Lovers 
 2010 UMEK - Chase The Moroder /Toolroom Records 
 2010 UMEK - OMGWTF /1605
 2010 UMEK - Circles Of Hell /1605
 2010 UMEK - Responding To Dynamic /1605
 2010 UMEK - Individual Breath /1605
 2010 UMEK, Jay Lumen - Sinful Ladies /Great Stuff Rec.

2000s
 2009 UMEK - Slap /1605
 2009 UMEK - Dementia EP /Hell Yeah 
 2009 UMEK - Work This Data /Dataworx Digital 
 2009 UMEK, Ramirez - Hablando /1605
 2009 UMEK - Curved Trajectory EP /1605
 2009 VA - Fat Of Excellence EP /Hell Yeah 
 2009 UMEK, Siniša Lukić - Blinking Indicator EP /1605
 2009 UMEK - You Might Hear Nothing The Remixes /Dataworx Digital 
 2009 UMEK - Carbon Occasions /Pacha Rec. 
 2009 UMEK, Tomy DeClerque - Reason Revealed /Terminal M 
 2009 UMEK - Twisted Route EP /Soundz 
 2009 UMEK - Heat Mode EP /Jericho 
 2009 UMEK - 16th Century Japan EP /Astrodisco 
 2009 UMEK - You Might Hear Nothing /Dataworx Digital 
 2009 UMEK - Designed Persona /Tronic 
 2009 UMEK - S Cream /Hell Yeah 
 2009 UMEK, Mugwump - Mindflexes / Pravim Haos /Cocoon Rec. 
 2009 UMEK - Destructible Environment /Sixteenofive 
 2009 UMEK, Beltek - Is It / Longer Trail /Pilot6 Rec. (Armada) 
 2008 UMEK - Generation After EP /Italo Business 
 2008 UMEK - Gatex EP /Sixteenofive 
 2008 UMEK, Beltek - Army Of Two /Pilot6 Rec. (Armada) 
 2008 UMEK - Vice Grip /Circle Music 
 2008 UMEK - Complex Puzzle /Proton Music 
 2008 UMEK feat. Andja - Carbon Occasions /Ultra Records 
 2008 UMEK - Utopia EP /Renaissance 
 2008 UMEK, Matthew Hoag - One Option & The Santien Race /Little Mountain Rec 
 2007 UMEK, I Turk - Anxious On Demand /Confused Rec 
 2007 VA - Various Punks Volume A /Datapunk 
 2007 UMEK - Carbon Occasions /Earresistible Musick 
 2007 UMEK - Akul EP /Audiomatique Rec 
 2007 UMEK - Print This Story /Manual Music 
 2006 UMEK - I Am Ready EP /Astrodisco 
 2006 UMEK - Another Matter Entirely /Jesus Loved You 
 2006 UMEK - Posing As Me EP /Earresistible Musick 
 2006 UMEK - Overtake And Command /Code X 
 2004 Polyvinyl - The Ruler Allows Mischief /Phont Music 
 2004 UMEK - Uxen EP /Jericho 
 2004 UMEK - Trust No One EP /Consumer Recreation 
 2004 UMEK - Hivid EP /Consumer 
 2004 Mumps - Mechanisms Q - S /Tortured Records 
 2004 UMEK - Zulu Samurai /Recon Warriors 
 2004 Polyvinyl - Tomorrow World /Genetic Recordings 
 2003 Zeta Reticula - EP 4 /Electrix Records 
 2003 UMEK - Voices Of Africa Volume 3 /Primate Recordings 
 2003 UMEK - Gatex /Insolent Music 
 2003 UMEK - Telontol /NovaMute 
 2003 UMEK - Conexan EP /Tial Records 
 2003 Recycled Loops - Filmofil EP /Recycled Loops 
 2003 UMEK - The Exorciser /Recycled Loops 
 2003 UMEK - Bodycounter EP /Consumer Recreation 
 2003 UMEK - Pharmacid EP /Consumer Recreation 
 2003 UMEK - Tonatol EP /Consumer Recreation 
 2002 UMEK - Voices Of Africa Volume 2 /Primate Recordings 
 2002 UMEK - Libido /Tehnika 
 2002 UMEK - Oranazol Part 2 /Jericho 
 2002 UMEK - Tikonal /NovaMute 
 2002 UMEK, Ignition Technician - Voodoo 3 /Voodoo Records(UK) 
 2002 VA - Volume One On One /Torta 
 2002 UMEK - Gatex (Remixes) /Magik Muzik 
 2002 UMEK - Gatex (Disc 2) /Magik Muzik UK 
 2002 UMEK - Gatex (Disc 1) /Magic Muzik 
 2002 UMEK - Neuro /Tehnika 
 2002 Los Tujlios - Los Tuljios Part 2 /Wetmusik 
 2002 Los Tujlios - Suna Talat EP /Wetmusik 
 2002 Kemu, Shark - Afrotek /Earresistible Musick 
 2002 UMEK - Fenaton / Jakaton /Bugged Out 
 2001 UMEK - Oranazol /Jericho 
 2001 VA - Kial 06 /Kial 
 2001 VA - The Second Porn Cut /Pornographic Rec 
 2001 Ben Long and UMEK - Imperial Leather / Mechanisms E /Painkillers 
 2001 UMEK - The X EP /Potential 
 2001 VA - Endlich Funfzig /Holzplatten 
 2001 VA - Endlich Funfzig /Holzplatten 
 2001 UMEK - Consumer Recreation EP /Green Force 
 2001 UMEK - Consumer Recreation EP /Primate Recordings 
 2001 VA - Imprint /Distinct'ive Records 
 2001 Zeta Reticula - EP 3 /Electrix Records 
 2001 VA - Electrocuted Presents Sexmachinemusic /Groovetech Records 
 2001 Mumps - Mechanisms M - P /Tortured Records 
 2001 UMEK - Ex Machina Ad Astra /Recycled Loops 
 2001 Recyclopaedia Eclectronica - Exerciser /Recycled Loops 
 2001 VA - Kupec 04 /Consumer Recreation 
 2001 UMEK - Težka Mašinerija /Consumer Recreation 
 2001 Kemu - Fantom /Earresistible Musick 
 2001 Kemu - Assymmetric /Earresistible Musick 
 2001 Kemu - Telstar /Earresistible Musick 
 2000 Recycled Loops - Body Re:Fuel /Recycled Loops 
 2000 UMEK - Kial 05 /Kial 
 2000 Chris Liebing & UMEK - Downtown EP /Primate Recordings 
 2000 UMEK - Glurenorm /Spiel - Zeug Schallplatten 
 2000 UMEK - Contra EP /Phont Music 
 2000 UMEK - The Right Time EP /Jericho 
 2000 UMEK - Voices Of Africa Volume 1 /Primate Recordings 
 2000 VA - Justin Robertson & Felix Da Housecat - Bugged Out /Virgin Records 
 2000 Recyclopaedia Eclectronica - Earresistible /Recycled Loops 
 2000 VA - Untitled (locked grooves) /Molecular Rec 
 2000 Zeta Reticula - EP 2 /Electrix Records 
 2000 Zeta Reticula - EP 1 /Electrix Records 
 2000 Mumps - Mechanisms E - L /Tortured Records 
 2000 VA - Consumer Recreation /Consumer Recreation 
 2000 Alba Patera - Tog EP /Monoid 
 2000 VA - Aktive Matrix /Matrix Musik

1990s
 1999 Mumps - Mechanisms A - D /Tortured Records 
 1999 UMEK vs. Inigo Kennedy - Made In Slovenia EP /Expire 
 1999 VA - Fuse presents Dave Clarke /Music Man Records 
 1999 UMEK & Ben Long - Audio 16 /Fine Audio Rec 
 1999 UMEK - Lanicor /Consumer Recreation 
 1999 Recyclopaedia Eclectronica - Hear No Evil, Play No Evil, Dance No Evil /Recycled Loops 
 1999 Recycled Loops - Six Is Nine EP /Primevil 
 1999 VA - Compilation For Medical Aid In Kosovo /Kobayashi Rec 
 1999 UMEK - Nodlocnost /Spiel - Zeug Schallplatten 
 1999 UMEK - Difolvon EP /C.L.R. 
 1999 UMEK - Kilevox EP /C.L.R. 
 1999 Polyvinyl - AB019 /ABsense 
 1999 Polyvinyl - AB018 /ABsense 
 1998 Nuca - 12SPIEL03 /Spiel - Zeug Schallplatten 
 1998 VA - Embryo Compilation /Embryo Records 
 1998 VA - Covert Operations /Planet Rhythm Rec 
 1998 DJ Misjah vs. UMEK - Al Kva? /X - Sub 
 1998 UMEK - Urtoxen EP /Black Nation Rec 
 1998 UMEK - Catapresan EP /E - COM 
 1998 Ratcapa - Guma EP /Planet Rhythm Rec 
 1998 UMEK - Prepidil /X - Sub 
 1998 Tiga - Radiogram /Planet Rhythm Rec 
 1998 UMEK - 732/Colours 
 1998 UMEK - AB016 /ABsense 
 1998 Polyvinyl - Polyvinyl 2x12 /ABsense 
 1997 UMEK - AB008 /ABsense 
 1997 UMEK - Glutamate /Communique Rec 
 1997 UMEK - Lek EP /Planet Rhythm Rec 
 1997 UMEK - Krka EP /Planet Rhythm Rec 
 1997 UMEK - Sample Rate EP /X - Sub 
 1997 UMEK - EX006 /Expire 
 1997 UMEK - EX001 /Expire 
 1997 VA - Picture disc /X - Trax 
 1997 UMEK - Audio /ZET 
 1997 UMEK - Oxetal / Aspirin /ZET 
 1996 UMEK - Escalator /ZET 
 1996 Thorax - Thorax 2 /ABsense 
 1996 Thorax - Thorax /ABsense

Remixes 
 2014 Chris Lake, Jareth - Helium (UMEK & Mike Vale Remix) /Ultra 
 2013 Fedde Le Grand - Metrum (UMEK Remix) /Toolroom Records 
 2013 Ralph Falcon - The Dig /Renaissance Back Catalog 
 2013 Parov Stelar - All Night /1605
 2013 Bontan - The Revolution (UMEK Remix) /Kraftek 
 2012 Tomaz & Filterheadz - Sunshine (Remixes 2012 ) /1605
 2011 Pleasurekraft - Satyr Song /1605
 2011 VA - Remixed At 16:05 Volume 2 /1605
 2011 D - Unity - Purple Pills /Beat Therapy Rec 
 2011 Tocadisco feat. L. A. Salomon - Alright /Superstar Rec 
 2011 Drax LTD II - Amphetamine /AFU Limited 
 2010 Sebastien Leger - Gone Wild / Mixtape /Mistakes Music 
 2010 Mauro Picotto - 2010 The Remixes Part 1 /Alchemy 
 2010 Rah Band - Clouds Across The Moon Part 1 /Great Stuff Rec 
 2010 Spektre - Casting Shadows Without Light /Respekt Rec 
 2010 Christian Smith - Break It Down /Tronic 
 2010 Koen Groeneveld - Fly - By - Wire /Abzolut 
 2010 Duca - Home /Tribal Vision Rec 
 2010 Thomas Gold - The Button /Toolroom Records 
 2009 Fergie - Exit People /1605
 2009 Jack de Molay vs. Libex - Wiplash /Hollister Records 
 2009 David Scaloni - Technida /Weave Music 
 2009 Dyno - Karmient /Hell Yeah 
 2009 Joseph Capriati - C'est La Vie / Oasi Remix /Analytictrail 
 2009 Rafael Noronha, Re Dupre, Eric Entrena - Underground /Dirty Players 
 2009 Oliver Koletzki, Roland Clark - Yes We Can /Hell Yeah 
 2009 Kalva, Filth & Splendour - Divide /Twisted Frequency Rec. 
 2009 Lucca - Acapulco Classics (Part 1) /Sound of Acapulco 
 2009 Jimmy Van M - My Eyes (Part 2) /Proton Music 
 2009 Fergie - The Me EP (Rewired) /Excentric Muzik 
 2009 DiDark, Julien Hox - Sonus Populi /Dihox Records 
 2008 Deep Flexion - Dialogue /Coldharbour Recordings Red (Armada) 
 2008 Jeremiah - Surface Of The Moon /Ambig Records 
 2008 David Granha - Las Aventuras /Acid Milk Recordings 
 2008 Ralph Falcon - The Dig /Renaissance 
 2007 Julian Jeweil - Air Conditionne Remixed /Skryptom Records 
 2006 Sylvain & Shark ft. Neuropolitan - The Exit EP /Jesus Loved You 
 2006 Nathan Fake - Outhouse (Rmx Part 1) /Recycled Loops 
 2006 DJ Lucca - Rewiver /Acapulco 
 2006 Player - Infamous Player Remixes Vol. 8 /Infamous Player 
 2005 String Theory - Swarm (UMEK's Polyvinyl Remix) /Intec Records 
 2005 DJ Lucca & Chris Cowie - Mirage Remixed /F1 Recordings 
 2005 Silence - Skin /Matrix Musik 
 2004 Stanny Franssenn - Phunkeee Remix EP /Zenit 
 2004 DK8 - Murder Was The Bass (The Remixes Part II) /ELP Medien & Verlags GmbH 
 2004 Lucca - Freedom /Acapulco 
 2003 Laibach - Tanz Mit Laibach /Mute Recordings 
 2003 Laibach - Tanz Mit Laibach /Mute Recordings 
 2003 Transparent Sound - Fade 2 Grey /Electrix Records 
 2003 Wally Lopez & Dr Kucho - Patricia Never Leaves The House (Remixes) /Bugged Out 
 2003 VA - International Underground EP Vol. 2 /Access 58 
 2002 Steve D - Red Fever /Recycled Loops 
 2002 Mateo Murphy - Love Express Remixes /Turbo 
 2002 Ian Void - Hunger /Geushky 
 2002 VA - Collaborations & Remixes Vol. 2 /Access 58 
 2002 DJ Rush - Get On Up Remix EP /Pro - Jex 
 2002 Souvernace - Havin´ A good time /Hi - Bias Records Inc. 
 2002 Marco Bailey - Capture /MB Elektronics 
 2002 Speedy J - Bugmod /NovaMute (US) 
 2002 Speedy J - Bugmod /NovaMute 
 2002 Kisum - Musik /Mantra Vibes 
 2002 The Advent - Recreations Part 2 /Kombination Research 
 2002 DJ Futureshock - Third Wave /End Recordings 
 2002 DJ Montana - Theme From Concept /Maelstrom Records 
 2002 DJ Montana - Theme From Concept /Black Hole Rec 
 2001 DJ One Finger - Housefucker /Insolent Tracks 
 2001 DJ One Finger - Housefucker (Remixes) /Blq Records 
 2001 Christian Varela - Pains (Remixes) /Primate Recordings 
 2001 Souvernace - Havin´ A good time /Positiva 
 2001 S.O.L.I.S. - Dolphins /Additive 
 2001 UK Gold - Agent Wood (Remixes) /Primevil 
 2001 Co - Fusion - Material To Digital To Analog EP /Reel Musiq 
 2001 Depeche Mode - I Feel Loved /PIAS 
 2001 Depeche Mode - I Feel Loved (Disc 2) /Mute Records Ltd. 
 2001 Depeche Mode - I Feel Loved /Mute Records Ltd. 
 2001 VA - Technosis 2 /Technosis 
 2001 Simon Digby & Will E Tell - Nighttime Activitiez /Wetmusik 
 2001 Asem Shama - Conception Remixes /Ghostline Electronics 
 2000 Sueno Latino - Sueno Latino (Recycled Loops Remix) /Mantra Vibes 
 2000 Sueno Latino - Sueno Latino /House No. 
 2000 Hitoshi Ohishi - New Deal EP /Primevil 
 2000 Santos - Camels /Ultra Records 
 2000 Santos - Camels /House No. 
 2000 Santos - Camels /Mercury 
 2000 Santos - Camels /ZYX Music 
 2000 Per Mikael P - Lux /G - Force Records 
 2000 Cold Dust - Remix EP 01 /Red Seal 
 2000 VA - Light And Shadow EP /Access 58 
 2000 Jamie Bissmire - Sacred Ground (UMEK Remixes) /Ground 
 2000 DJ One Finger - House Fucker /Missile Records 
 2000 Ade Fenton - The Remixes (Part 1) /Advanced 
 2000 La Monde vs. Levantine - Base (Remixes) /Monoid 
 1999 Space DJz - AK - 47 (Remixes) /Potential 
 1999 Ben Long - Potential 002 (Remixes) /Potential

Compilation

2014
 2014 VA - Toolroom Records Selector Series: 20 Simon Doty /Toolroom Longplayer 
 2014 VA - Monotone Vol. 28 - Tech House Selection /Recovery House 
 2014 VA - The Best of Tech You Very Much (Top 25 All Time Tech House Hits) /Tech You Very Much! 
 2014 VA - Organic Underground Beats, Vol. 2 (Mixed By Baramuda) /ADSR Records 
 2014 VA - Deeperfect Ibiza 2014 Mixed By Oscar Aguilera /Deeperfect Records 
 2014 VA - Tech House for the VIP Room, Vol. 3 (Extraordinary Unmixed Tracks) /Tech You Very Much! 
 2014 VA - Brazil Beats Cup 2014 /ADSR Records 
 2014 VA - Sensation Welcome to the Pleasuredome /Be Yourself Music 
 2014 VA - Catch A Groove (Vol. 8) /Roxy Records 
 2014 VA - Underground Top 50 /ADSR Records 
 2014 VA - Full House Volume 26 /Recovery House 
 2014 VA - Ibiza Glamour House /On Air 
 2014 VA - Citybeats 2014, Vol. 2 By Baramuda /ADSR Records 
 2014 VA - New York House Odyssey, Vol. 8 /Restore Music 
 2014 VA - Rocking Down The House In Ibiza 2014 /Club Session 
 2014 VA - Kick - Off Brazil - The World Cup House Party /Music Is The Answer 
 2014 VA - Tech House Masterpieces /Tech You Very Much! 
 2014 VA - Deep and Twisted, Vol. 4 /ADSR Records 
 2014 VA - IBIZA ALL TIME CLASSICS (CHAPTER 004) /Tiger Records 
 2014 VA - Takeover IBIZA 2014 - The House Edition /House Of House 
 2014 VA - Toolroom Records Selector Series: 19 Phunk Investigation /Toolroom Longplayer 
 2014 VA - Toolroom Ibiza 2014 /Toolroom Records 
 2014 VA - 12 Bombs To Rock - The House Edition 7 /House Of House 
 2014 VA - Tech House Terrace Party /iCompilations 
 2014 VA - Ibiza All Time Classics (Chapter 002) /Tiger Records 
 2014 VA - The Inner Life of Techno, Vol. 6 /Complex Textures 
 2014 VA - House Generation Presented By Slideback /Recovery House 
 2014 VA - Nothing But A Party /InStereo Recordings 
 2014 VA - Nothing but House Music Vol. 1 /Re:vibe Music 
 2014 VA - A Tribute to Chicago, Vol. 4 /Gastspiel Records 
 2014 VA - House, House And More F..king House Vol. 6 /Recovery House 
 2014 VA - Miami 2014 - Unmixed DJ Version /CR2 Live & Direct Unmixed 
 2014 VA - New York Deep & Tech House Volume 2 /iCompilations 
 2014 VA - Underground Series Tokyo /Club Session 
 2014 VA - HTFT VOL. 5 (HARD TO FIND TRACKS) /Tiger Records 
 2014 VA - From The Speakers Vol. 13 /Recovery House 
 2014 VA - House Is A Feeling Vol. 12 /House Of House 
 2014 VA - Underground Deep & Tech House /iCompilations 
 2014 VA - Club Session Pres. Club Weapons No. 51 /Club Session 
 2014 VA - Ibiza Opening Party 2014 (Edition 1) /Club Control 
 2014 VA - Elektika Miami, Vol.1 /Elektika 
 2014 VA - Advance! Vol. 8 /Recovery House 
 2014 VA - House Generation Presented By ESQUIRE /Recovery House 
 2014 VA - Toolroom Records Selector Series: 16 The Cube Guys /Toolroom Longplayer 
 2014 VA - House Nation Clubbing 2014 /Recovery House 
 2014 VA - Artificial Moves, Vol. 4 - Inspirations in Techhouse /Complex Textures 
 2014 VA - Miami Pool Party 2014 /LO:GO Recordings 
 2014 VA - Club Session Pres. High 5 /Club Session 
 2014 VA - Miami 2014 - Mixed by MYNC, Carnage, Sunnery James, Ryan Marciano, Wayne,Woods /Cr2 Raecords 
 2014 VA - Rocking Down The House In Miami 2014 /Club Session 
 2014 VA - The Best Of Sphera Volume 9 /Sphera Records 
 2014 VA - From The Speakers Vol. 12 /Recovery House 
 2014 VA - Toolroom Records Selector Series: 15 Federico Scavo /Toolroom Longplayer 
 2014 VA - House Club Essentials - Vol. 8 /Music Is The Answer 
 2014 VA - Stereonized - Tech House Selection Vol. 18 /Recovery House 
 2014 VA - Tech House - Volume 3 /Cr2 Records 
 2014 VA - Tech in da House 3 (A Fine Tech House Selection) /KNM 
 2014 VA - The Best of Ibiza /Cr2 Records 
 2014 VA - Kraftworxs - TEKKNO /Tiger Records 
 2014 VA - Global Underground 2014 /Global Underground 
 2014 VA - Running Electronica 2 (For a Cool Rush of Blood to the Head) /KNM 
 2014 VA - SOUND OF TIGER - THE ANNUAL 2014 /LO:GO Recordings 
 2014 VA - Cologne Runners (Vol. 2) /Roxy Records 
 2014 VA - Deeperfect Annual 2013 /Deeperfect Records

2013
 2013 VA - Rekursion : Black /Dieb Audio 
 2013 VA - Music With Love - Charity For Sardegna /Natura Viva 
 2013 VA - Midnight Heroes, Vol. 3 (Mixed By A.C.K.) (Special Edition! 4 DJ Mixes & 58 Unmixed Tracks for Underground People) /Tech You Very Much! 
 2013 VA - This Is House /iCompilations 
 2013 VA - We Are ADSR /ADSR Records 
 2013 VA - Best Of Toolroom Records 2013 /Toolroom Records 
 2013 VA - Best Of Toolroom Records 2013 (Traktor Remix Sets) /Toolroom Records 
 2013 VA - Mike Newman Presents Groove Your Body Vol 2 /WTF! Music 
 2013 VA - Festival Classics (Vol. 2) /Tiger Records 
 2013 VA - 10 Years Armada /Armada Music Bundles 
 2013 VA - Tech Cubes, Vol. 5 - Selection of Finest Tech - House Tunes! /Tretmuehle 
 2013 VA - Electrolicious, Vol. 3 (Compiled & Mixed By Dennis Bohn) /KNM 
 2013 VA - Techno Science Fiction (Massive Techno & Minimal Tracks) (Presented By A.C.K.) /Tech You Very Much! 
 2013 VA - The Art Of Sound, Vol. 3 /Play My Track Rec 
 2013 VA - 30 Trance Classics /Essential Dance 
 2013 VA - Open Air Classics /Tiger Records 
 2013 VA - Unity Vol. 2 Compilation /Unity Records 
 2013 VA - Ministry Of Sound: Canada /Ministry Of Sound (UK) 
 2013 VA - The Journey (Hell & Heaven) Part1 /Sphera Records 
 2013 VA - House Generation presented by Chris Montana & Chris Bekker /Recovery House 
 2013 VA - Open Air 2013 /Tiger Records 
 2013 VA - Best Of Tech /Hollister Records 
 2013 VA - Toolroom Knights Mixed By Dannic /Toolroom Records 
 2013 VA - Hotfingers Talks Selected And Mixed By DJ PP /Hotfingers 
 2013 VA - Balearic Bangers from Ibiza (A Fine Selection of Deep & Tech House Grooves) /KNM 
 2013 VA - Rhythm Distrikt 05 /Toolroom Records 
 2013 VA - Rocking Down The House - Electrified House Tunes Vol.17 /Recovery House 
 2013 VA - Groove Circus Vol. 4 /Wasabi Recordings 
 2013 VA - Ibiza 2013 Part 2 /Cr2 Records 
 2013 VA - Toolroom Records Ibiza 2013 Vol. 2 /Toolroom Records 
 2013 VA - Club Session Presented By Don Rossi /Club Session 
 2013 VA - Domplatte 15 (Die M8cht Am Rhein) /Tiger Records 
 2013 VA - Ibiza 2013 – Beatport Deluxe Edition /Cr2 Records 
 2013 VA - NYC To Miami Mixed By Electrobios & B.O.N.G. /Cherry Drop Records 
 2013 VA - Toolroom Ten /Toolroom Records 
 2013 VA - DreamBeach Villaricos Compilation 2013 /Alma Soul Music 
 2013 VA - Madre Natura Volume 12 /Natura Viva 
 2013 VA - Visa 4 Ibiza ELECTRO (2013 Edition) /Tiger Records 
 2013 VA - 5 Years Of Beat Therapy /Therapy Records 
 2013 VA - Real Ibiza 2013 (More Than A Beat) /Tiger Records 
 2013 VA - Deep City Grooves Paris /Recovery Tech 
 2013 VA - 10 Essential Sureplayer /Club Session 
 2013 VA - Pure Pacha Summer 2013 /Pacha Recordings 
 2013 VA - Techno With Balls, Vol. 4 /Sound Supreme 
 2013 VA - The Yacht Week Volume 3 /Cr2 Records 
 2013 VA - New York Underground /Cr2 Records 
 2013 VA - Gimme 5 (Vol. 13) /Vanity Records 
 2013 VA - Blaxx Bodygrooves /Tiger Records 
 2013 VA - Toolroom Records Ibiza 2013 Vol.1 /Toolroom Records 
 2013 VA - Tech House – Volume 01 /Cr2 Records 
 2013 VA - 5 Years Of Agile Recordings /Agile Recordings 
 2013 VA - 1605*5 /1605
 2013 VA - WTF! Tunes Volume 12 /WTF! Music 
 2013 VA - 2Elements :: Electric Boogie /Tiger Records 
 2013 VA - Electrify! Presented By Danniel Selfmade /Recovery Tech 
 2013 VA - HTFT VOL. 3 (HARD TO FIND TRACKS) /Tiger Records 
 2013 VA - Monotone Vol. 17 – Tech House Selection /Recovery House 
 2013 VA - Miami 2013 Tech House Hot Tracks (Selected By Paolo Madzone Zampetti) /Madzonegeneration Records 
 2013 VA - Kesselhaus Compilation A /Sound Supreme 
 2013 VA - Club Session Presented By Tune Brothers /Club Session 
 2013 VA - Gimme 5 (Vol. 1) /Vanity Records 
 2013 VA - Toolroom Knights Mixed by UMEK 2.0 /Toolroom Records 
 2013 VA - Confronted Part 4 /Recovery Tech 
 2013 VA - Principles Of Techno 4.0 /Doppelaenger 
 2013 VA - Monodisco Volume 6 /Recovery Tech 
 2013 VA - Global House Sounds Volume 16 /Recovery House 
 2013 VA - Dub Session Volume 10 /Recovery House 
 2013 VA - 5 Years Of Abzolut /Abzolut (Spinnin) 
 2013 VA - Pacha Recordings Miami /Pacha Recordings 
 2013 VA - WTF! Tunes Volume 11 /WTF! Music 
 2013 VA - Heroes Of Trance 2013 /ARVA 
 2013 VA - Elektro Presents Spinnin_Records - Part 2 /Spinnin Compilations 
 2013 VA - Finest Moments Volume 1 /Stolen Moments 
 2013 VA - Miami Sessions 2013 - Ministry Of Sound /Ministry of Sound (UK) 
 2013 VA - Get Smashed! Vol. 2 /Smash Music 
 2013 VA - Toolroom Records Miami 2013 /Toolroom Records 
 2013 VA - Faces Of House House Music Collection Vol. 17 /Recovery House 
 2013 VA - Miami House Volume 5 /Spinnin Compilations 
 2013 VA - House Bless You By Quentin Mosimann /DJ Center Records 
 2013 VA - EDM Tech House Essentials /iCompilations 
 2013 VA - Advance! /Recovery House 
 2013 VA - Markus Binapfl - 10 Years Miami /Tiger Records 
 2013 VA - Stereonized Tech House Selection Vol.10 /Recovery House 
 2013 VA - Tech House Sessions – Volume 03 /Cr2 Records 
 2013 VA - EDM House /iCompilations 
 2013 VA - EDM Tech House /iCompilations 
 2013 VA - Total Dance Club House Essentials Pt.1 /KNM 
 2013 VA - Kraftworkxs Tekkno /Tiger Records

2012
 2012 VA - Deeperfect Best Of 2012 /Deeperfect Records 
 2012 VA - United Colors Of House Volume 18 /Recovery House 
 2012 VA - Toolroom NYE Essentials 2012 /Toolroom Records 
 2012 VA - Role Models, Vol. 1 – Techno Music For Experienced People /Gastspiel Records 
 2012 VA - Best of Definitive 2012 /Definitive Rec 
 2012 VA - Best of Definitive Remixes 2012 /Definitive Rec 
 2012 VA - Focus On: Renaissance /PMI Dance 
 2012 VA - Yaiza Records Winter Compilation 2012 /Yaiza Records 
 2012 VA - Renaissance - Transitions - Vol. 3 /PMI Dance 
 2012 VA - Best Of Toolroom Records 2012 /Toolroom Records 
 2012 VA - 3 Years Of Amazing Records Part 1 /Amazing Records 
 2012 Mixed By MYNC - Best Of Cr2 2012 - Mixed By MYNC /Cr2 Records 
 2012 VA - Tech Language Volume 5 /Recovery Tech 
 2012 VA - Kraftworxs House /Tiger Records 
 2012 VA - Club Session Presented By Boogie Pimps /Club Session 
 2012 VA - Datatech Volume 4 /Recovery Tech 
 2012 VA - Re:Select /Voltaire Music 
 2012 VA - United Colors Of House Vol. 17 /Recovery House 
 2012 VA - Bootleg Social: Prohibition Series 01 /Bootleg Social Rec 
 2012 VA - Year Five - The Very Best Tracks /Skryptom Records 
 2012 VA - Technorama 5.0 /Recovery Tech 
 2012 Mixed By Stefano Noferini - Toolroom Knights mixed by Stefano Noferini /Toolroom Records 
 2012 VA - Headliners: Sander Van Doorn - Ministry Of Sound /Ministry Of Sound (UK) 
 2012 Mixed By Pagano, Nick Tcherniak & Nick Denton - Trade Deluxe Mixed By Pagano, Nick Tcherniak & Nick Denton /Toolbox House 
 2012 VA - Pure Tech 4 /Bonzai Basiks 
 2012 Mixed By Mladen Tomic - Deeperfect ADE 2012 /Deeperfect Records 
 2012 VA - Monotone Vol. 12 - Tech House Selection /Recovery House 
 2012 VA - Ministry Of Sound Live Amsterdam /Ministry Of Sound (UK) 
 2012 VA - Cr2 ADE Anthems 2012 /Cr2 Records 
 2012 VA - Progrez EP – Volume 8 /Progrez 
 2012 VA - Urban Vibez – The Underground Sound of House Music Vol. 12 /Recovery House 
 2012 VA - Dirty Electro House XI - Fall Equinox Edition /KNM 
 2012 VA - Ibiza Weapons (The Closing 2012 ) /Tiger Records 
 2012 VA - Madre Natura Volume 9 /Natura Viva 
 2012 VA - Is This Techno? Volume 4 /Recovery Tech 
 2012 VA - Stereonized – Tech House Selection Vol. 7 /Recovery House 
 2012 VA - Global Techno Sessions Vol. 1 /LW Recordings 
 2012 VA - Tech Language Volume 4 /Recovery House 
 2012 VA - Heavenly Night 2 /Heavenly Bodies 
 2012 VA - Plusquam Deluxe Vol. 6 Compiled By Don Vitalo /Plusquam Records 
 2012 VA - Toolroom Records Ibiza 2012 Vol.2 /Toolroom Records 
 2012 VA - No Music For Old Men, Vol. 3 - Dirtiest Techno Tunes /City Life 
 2012 VA - Real Ibiza 2012 /Tiger Records 
 2012 VA - Organic Tech - House Vol. 6 /Great Stuff Rec 
 2012 VA - Faces Of House – House Music Collection Vol 13 /Recovery House 
 2012 VA - suSu Refreshed - Sexy Electronic House Beats & Dub /PMI Dance 
 2012 VA - Amnesia Ibiza Summer 2012 /DJ Center Records 
 2012 VA - I Rave You! - Filthy House & Sexy Electro /KNM 
 2012 VA - Ibiza Underground – Vol. 01 /Cr2 Records 
 2012 VA - 40 Best Ibiza Anthems Ever - Part 2 /ARVA 
 2012 VA - Night & Day /Yoshitoshi Rec 
 2012 VA - Day /Yoshitoshi Rec 
 2012 VA - Toolroom Ibiza Essentials 2012 /Toolroom Records 
 2012 VA - Kult Kollektor 2 /Bonzai Progressive 
 2012 VA - Sensation - Source of Light - Exclusive Edition /Be Yourself Music 
 2012 VA - La Troya (Amnesia Ibiza 2012 ) /DJ Center Records 
 2012 VA - Ibiza Weapons 2012 (Part 2) /Tiger Records 
 2012 VA - Techness Shot Vol. 5 /Xelon Entertainment 
 2012 VA - Ibiza Opening Party /iCompilations 
 2012 VA - Ibilektro : The Sound Of Ibiza 2012 /Tiger Records 
 2012 VA - Music With Love - Charity For Emilia Romagna /Natura Viva 
 2012 Mixed By Alex Miles and Toby Holguin & DJ Moffour - Bora - Bora Ibiza 2012 /King Of Ibiza Records 
 2012 VA - Beatless - A Soundtrack /SOUNDZ 
 2012 Mixed By Mike Vale - Mike Vale Presents Selezione Naturale Volume 1 /Natura Viva 
 2012 VA - Toolroom Records Ibiza 2012 Vol.1 /Toolroom Records 
 2012 VA - Catch A Groove (Volume 3) /Roxy Records 
 2012 VA - House Top 40 (Best of Progressive Tech - & Electro House) /KNM 
 2012 VA - Dirty Electro House X - Summer Edition /KNM 
 2012 VA - MIX:REMIX /SOUNDZ 
 2012 VA - Ibiza Terrace Tech House /iCompilations 
 2012 VA - Saturday Sessions /Ministry of Sound (UK) 
 2012 VA - IBIZA Weapons 2012 /Tiger Records 
 2012 VA - Techno Masterbeats /Tiger Records 
 2012 VA - SOUNDZ VOL.4 (COMPILED BY THE SOUNDZ) /SOUNDZ 
 2012 VA - Dance 1st Church - Deejay Monster Remixes Vol. 2 /DFC - Dance Floor Corporation 
 2012 Mixed By Eddie Halliwell - Toolroom Knights Mixed By Eddie Halliwell /Toolroom Records 
 2012 VA - Kult Kollektor /Bonzai Progressive 
 2012 VA - Domplatte 7 (Die M8 Am Rhein) /Tiger Records 
 2012 VA - 97 98 99... /Hell Yeah 
 2012 VA - Miami 2012 - Unmixed DJ Format /CR2 Live & Direct Unmixed 
 2012 VA - Total Minimal, Vol. 6 /KNM 
 2012 VA - Masterbeats (Vol. 2) /Tiger Records 
 2012 VA - Comp, Vol. 3 /Minimalminuts 
 2012 VA - INDAHOUSE Vol 1 /Ego 
 2012 VA - Rhythm Distrikt 01 /Toolroom Records 
 2012 VA - Body Grooves :: 2Elements /Tiger Records 
 2012 VA - Ministry Of Sound Live: Brazil /Ministry Of Sound (UK) 
 2012 VA - Catch A Groove (Volume 2) /Roxy Records 
 2012 VA - Toolroom Records Miami 2012 /Toolroom Records 
 2012 Mixed by MYNC & Nicky Romero - Miami 2012 /Cr2 Records 
 2012 VA - Djuma Soundsystem Presents The 3rd Dimension of Soundz /SOUNDZ 
 2012 VA - Trade The Dark Side By Pagano /ToolBox House 
 2012 VA - Best Of Ramirez - The Remixes /DFC - Dance Floor Corporation 
 2012 VA - Big Room House - Vol. 2 /Cr2 Records 
 2012 Mixed by Enzo Elia - Enzo Elia? Hell Yeah /Hell Yeah 
 2012 VA - Berlin Afterhour 3 - From Minimal To Techno - From Electro To House /KNM 
 2012 VA - Six Years /Twisted Frequency Recordings 
 2012 VA - Superstar DJ's Vol. 2 /Cr2 Records 
 2012 VA - Winter Club Hits /iCompilations

2011
 2011 Mixed by Paul Strive - Tech House Sessions 2011 /Cr2 Records 
 2011 VA - New Years Clubbing Anthems /iCompilations 
 2011 VA - Cr2 Live & Direct Radio Show - Best Of The Year 2011 /CR2 Records 
 2011 VA - Best Of 2011 /CR2 Records 
 2011 VA - Munich Disco Tech - Final Chapter - The Gold Edition /Great Stuff Recordings 
 2011 VA - Progressive Power, Vol. 1 /Armada Music 
 2011 VA - Best Of Toolroom Records 2011 /Toolroom Records 
 2011 VA - Cr2 Introducing - Paul Strive /Cr2 Records 
 2011 VA - Great Stuff Present Driving Beats Vol. 1 /KNM 
 2011 VA - Tech House Sessions - Volume 02 /Cr2 Records 
 2011 VA - Mixed For Feet Vol. 1 - Unmixed /Armada Music 
 2011 Mixed by Christian Cambas - 1605 Ways To Deal With Christian Cambas /1605
 2011 VA - Enjoy Techno ! Volume 4 /Galore Music 
 2011 VA - Haute Couture 2011 mixed by Claudia Cazacu /Couture (Spinnin) 
 2011 VA - Space Ibiza Unmixed /CR2 Live & Direct Unmixed 
 2011 Mixed by Claudia Cazacu - Haute Couture 2011 mixed by Claudia Cazacu /Couture (Spinnin) 
 2011 VA - BPM Japan Charity Album Vol. 3 /BPM JAPAN 
 2011 VA - Progressive Tunes Volume 9 /Armada Music 
 2011 VA - Techno Prisoners /iCompilations 
 2011 VA - Progrez EP – Volume 3 /Progrez 
 2011 VA - Organic Tech House Vol. 5 /Great Stuff Rec 
 2011 VA mixed by Gabriel & Dresden - Mixed For Feet Vol. 1 /Armada Music 
 2011 VA - Toolroom Records Ibiza 2011 Vol.2 /Toolroom Records 
 2011 VA - Cr2 Live & Direct Radio Show – July 2011 /Cr2 Records 
 2011 VA - Pacha Summer 2011 /Pacha Recordings 
 2011 VA - Take Me To Ibiza (Day Edition) /Avenue Recordings 
 2011 VA - Remixed At 16:05 Volume 2 /1605
 2011 VA - Space Ibiza – Compiled By MYNC /Cr2 Records 
 2011 VA - Perceptions Od Pacha VI (Disc 2) /Pacha Recordings 
 2011 VA - Via Notte /Elektik Media 
 2011 VA - Pilot 6 Collected Vol. 1 /Armada Music 
 2011 VA - Cr2 Presents Live & Direct MYNC (Unmixed) /Cr2 Live & Direct Unmixed 
 2011 VA - Plusquam Deluxe III Compiled By Don Vitalo /Plusquam Records 
 2011 VA - Ibiza 2011 Unmixed: Beatport Special Edition /Cr2 Live & Direct Unmixed 
 2011 VA - Elrow Sonar Promo /Beatport Promotion 
 2011 VA - Ibiza Clubsounds Vol. 1 /Tronic Soundz 
 2011 VA - Ibiza '11 /Armada Music 
 2011 VA - Toolroom Records Ibiza 2011 Vol.1 /Toolroom Records 
 2011 VA - Techno 2011 Vol. 3 /Armada Music 
 2011 VA - Oxyd City Best Summer Selection /Oxyd City 
 2011 VA - Ibiza 2011 Beatport Special Edition /Cr2 Records 
 2011 VA - Spring Schlagers /1605
 2011 VA - Techno /303Lovers 
 2011 VA - Turbo Century I /Turbo Recordings 
 2011 VA - Jack De Molay Presents – Spring Best Of Tek'N'Tekno /Hollister Records 
 2011 VA - Cr2 Presents Live & Direct MYNC /Cr2 Records 
 2011 VA - Tollroom Selector Series: 5 - Koen Groeneveld /Toolroom Records 
 2011 VA - Munich Disco Tech Volume 10 /Great Stuff Rec 
 2011 VA - Adult Entertainment With James Vevers: The Black Mixes Pt. 2 /Pacha Recordings 
 2011 VA - Beat Therapy Vol. 1 /Beat Therapy Rec 
 2011 VA - 50 Techno Hits /Cr2 Records 
 2011 Mixed by UMEK - Toolroom Knights Mixed by UMEK /Toolroom Records 
 2011 VA - Pacha Recordings Miami Mix /Pacha Recordings 
 2011 VA - Azuli Presents: Miami '11 /Azuli Records 
 2011 VA - Toolroom Records Miami 2011 /Toolroom Records 
 2011 VA - 15 Years Confused Rec. - Happy Birthday Mix /Confused Rec 
 2011 VA - Hollister Best Of Tek & Tekno /Hollister Records 
 2011 VA - Monsters Of Techno Vol. 5 /Craft Music 
 2011 VA - Dirty Dutch Fallout – Unmixed Dj Version /Dirty Dutch Records 
 2011 VA - Techno 2011 Volume 1 /Armada Music 
 2011 VA - Chronicles X. /Tribal Vision Records

2010
 2010 VA - Toolroom Records Vs. Leaders Of The New School – Best Of 2010 /Toolroom Records 
 2010 Mixed By Chuckie - Dirty Dutch Fallout /Dirty Dutch Records 
 2010 VA - Screaming Electro House Vol. 1 /Tronic Soundz 
 2010 VA - DYNO? Hell Yeah /Hell Yeah 
 2010 VA - Hotfingers Mus - Haves /Hotfingers 
 2010 VA - Best Of 2010 /Cr2 Records 
 2010 VA - Nervous Forgotten Bombs /Nervous Records 
 2010 VA - Alex D'Elia & Nihil Young Present: Ready 2 Rock Vol. 1 – Finest Techno And Minimal /Ready 2 Rock 
 2010 VA - Winter Mix 2010 /Cr2 Records 
 2010 VA - Libex Present's – Hollister Best Of Winter /Hollister Records 
 2010 VA - Progressive Tunes Volume 5 /Armada Music 
 2010 VA - 100! /Evolution Rec 
 2010 VA - Future Techno – The Worlds Biggest Techno Anthems /Spinnin Bundles 
 2010 VA - Basslines Vol. 2 – Deluxe Edition /Cr2 Records 
 2010 VA - Love Is In The Air /303Lovers 
 2010 VA - 20 Progressive House Tunes Volume 5 /Armada Music 
 2010 VA - Flamingo Nights Vol. 2 New York /Flamingo Rec 
 2010 VA - From Techno To Paradise /Mantra Vibes 
 2010 VA - Abzolut Essentials 2010 - 2 /Abzolut (Spinnin) 
 2010 VA - Ibiza Progressive Tunes 2010 /Armada Music 
 2010 VA - Pacha Ibiza Vip Vol. 4: CD 3 /Pacha Recordings 
 2010 VA - Wake Me Up At 16:05 /1605
 2010 VA - Toolroom Records Ibiza 2010 – Vol. 2 /Toolroom Records 
 2010 VA - Dataworx Code Series 02 /Dataworx Digital 
 2010 VA - The Underground 2010 : Techno /Ministry Of Sound (UK) 
 2010 VA - 5 Years Of Manual Music Part 3/3 - Unmixed /Manual Music 
 2010 VA - Audiomatique History Part 1 /Audiomatique Rec 
 2010 VA - 1605 Prvo Poglavje /1605
 2010 VA - Armada 15 House Extended Versions /Armada Music 
 2010 VA - Twisted Frequency Remixed /Twisted Frequency Recordings 
 2010 VA - Dataworx Code Series 01 /Dataworx Digital 
 2010 VA - Organic Techhouse Volume 3 /Great Stuff Rec 
 2010 VA - 5 Years Of Manual Music Part 2/3 - Unmixed /Manual Music 
 2010 VA - Toolroom Presents: The Beatport Nominees 2010 /Toolroom Records 
 2010 VA - Amsterdam City Of Tech House 2 /Spinnin Bundles 
 2010 VA - Monsters Of Techno Volume 4 /Craft Music 
 2010 VA - House Beats Volume 4 /Armada Music 
 2010 VA - Progressive Deluxe 2010 Volume 1 - 30 Tunes Exclusively Selected /Armada Music 
 2010 VA - Progressive House Fever Volume 1 /Fever 
 2010 VA - Hollister Best Spring 2010 /Hollister Records 
 2010 VA - Responding To Dynamic /1605
 2010 VA - Loopdiggaz – Straight Outta Looplandia Vol 2 /Hell Yeah 
 2010 VA - Toolroom Records Miami 2010 /Toolroom Records 
 2010 VA - Tronic Treatment 2010 /Tronic 
 2010 VA - GU38 Carl Cox Black Rock Desert /Global Underground 
 2010 VA - And All Milani Says... Volume 2 /Hell Yeah 
 2010 VA - Munich Disco Tech Volume 6 /Great Stuff Rec 
 2010 VA - The Ibiza Years – Al Velilla /Pacha Recordings

2009
 2009 VA - Hollister Best Of Tech /Hollister Records 
 2009 VA - Remixed At 16:05 /1605
 2009 VA - From Disco To Techno /Mantra Vibes 
 2009 VA - Space Ibiza - Around The World Unmixed Dj Format /Cr2 Live & Direct Unmixed 
 2009 VA - Best Of Pilot 6 2009 /Armada Music 
 2009 VA - Best Of Progressive 2009 /Armada Music 
 2009 VA - Twisted Frequencies Volume 3 /Twisted Frequencies Recordings 
 2009 VA - Armada Best Of House 2009 /Armada Music 
 2009 VA - Space Ibiza – Around The World – Beatport Exclusive Version /Cr2 Records 
 2009 VA - Fat Of Excellence – The Mix /Hell Yeah 
 2009 VA - Dark Shades Part 1 /SK Supreme Rec 
 2009 VA - Soundzsystem Vol. 2 – Mixed by Tony Senghore /Soundz 
 2009 VA - Vertigo The Official Album /Evolution Rec 
 2009 VA - The Armada DJ Extended Versions Collection 2009 /Armada music 
 2009 Mixed by Neil Quigley - Focus On: Renaissance /Renaissance 
 2009 Mixed by Hakan Lidbo - Soundzystem Vol. 1 /Soundz 
 2009 UMEK - UMEK? Hell Yeah /Hell Yeah 
 2009 VA - Summer Of Dance 2009 /Cloud 9 Dance 
 2009 VA - Pacha Ibiza Vip Vol. 3: Black /Pacha Recordings 
 2009 VA - Best Of Circle /Circle Music 
 2009 VA - Hafentunnel 2009 /BigCityBeats Rec 
 2009 VA - United DJs For Abruzzo /Footloversmusic 
 2009 VA - Ibiza Trance Tunes 2009 /Armada Music 
 - Highway Chapter 3 /World Club Music 
 2009 VA - Maximum House Vol. 7 /Armada Music 
 2009 VA - 20 Progressive House Tunes Vol. 2 /Armada Music 
 2009 VA - House Beats Volume 2 /Armada Music 
 2009 VA - A State Of Trance 400 /Armada Music 
 2009 VA - Toronto 09 /Armada Music 
 2009 VA - Armada - The Miami Essentials 2009 /Armada Music 
 2009 VA - And All Milano Says... /Hell Yeah 
 2009 VA - Revised Moments Volume 1 /Stolen Moments 
 2009 VA - The Best Of 2008 /Evolution Rec 
 2009 VA - I Love Progressive Volume 5 /Armada Music 
 2008 VA - Coldharbour Rec Recordings The Best Of 2008 /Armada Music 
 2008 VA mixed by Alex Flatner - Mechanic Side Of Nature /Circle/Daredo Music 
 2008 VA - Armada Progressive Trance Tunes Volume 9 /Armada Music 
 2008 VA - Trance 2008 – The Best Tunes In The Mix Trance Yearmix Part 1 /Armada Music 
 2008 VA - Pilot6 Recordings The Best Of 2008 /Armada Music 
 2008 VA - House Music Volume 5 /Armada Music 
 2008 VA - Club Elite Sessions Vol. 1 /Armada Music 
 2008 VA - Synchronicity /Armada Music 
 2008 VA - 20 Underground Music Tunes Volume 5 /Armada Music 
 2008 VA - Armada At Ibiza 2008 /Armada Music 
 2008 VA - Armada's Amsterdam Dance Event Tunes (2008 ) /Armada Music 
 2008 VA - Armada Trance Vol. 4 /Armada Music 
 2008 VA - Soundz Vol. 1 /Soundz 
 2008 VA mixed by Shawn Mitiska - Mile High Sessions Volume 1 /Armada Music 
 2008 VA mixed by Arnej - Tranceposition Vol. 1 /Armada Digital 
 2008 VA - A State Of Trance Classics Vol. 3 /Cloud 9 Music BV 
 2008 VA mixed by DJ Mark Green - Black Hole Recordings 10 Year Anniversary CD /Black Hole Rec 
 2008 VA mixed by Ben Long - Ekspozicija 06: The Long Winter Mix /Explicit Musick 
 2008 VA mixed by Louie DeVito - DeVito NYC Underground Party Vol. 8 /Ultra Records 
 2008 VA - Top DJs 5 - UMEK Plays For Θema /Πρώτο ΘΕΜΑ 
 2008 VA mixed by Nick K - Nu Visions /Armada Music 
 2008 VA mixed by Dan Desnoyers - Live At Pacha Club Egypt Sharm El Sheikh /DKD D - Noy Muzik 
 2008 VA - Slices Music Video Collection /Electronic Beats 
 2008 VA mixed by Dave Seaman - The Masters Series /Renaissance 
 2007 VA - La Terrrazza (Disc 1) /Circle Music 
 2007 VA - X Trax Techno Classics 2 /Mid - Town Records 
 2007 VA - X Trax Techno Classics 1 /Mid - Town Records 
 2007 VA - Various Punks Vol. A /Datapunk 
 2007 VA mixed by Jimmy Van M - Balance 10.1. /EQ Recordings 
 2007 VA mixed by DJ Lucca - Sound of Acapulco Spring 2007 /Acapulco Records 
 2007 VA compiled&mixed by PF - Allstars - Private Fiction 6 /Universal Music (CH) 
 2007 VA mixed by Carl Cox - Global /Koch Records 
 2007 VA mixed by Sander Kleinenberg - This Is Sander Kleinenberg /Ultra Records 
 2007 VA mixed by Sander Kleinenberg - This Is Sander Kleinenberg /Diamond Records 
 2007 VA mixed by Sander Kleinenberg - This Is Sander Kleinenberg /Renaissance 
 2007 VA - We Are Punks 2 /Datapunk 
 2007 VA mixed by Eddie Halliwell - Cream Ibiza 2007 /New State Recordings 
 2007 VA mixed by John Digweed - Transitions Vol. 3 /Thrive Records 
 2007 VA mixed by John Digweed - Transitions Vol. 3 /High Note Records 
 2007 VA mixed by John Digweed - Transitions Vol. 3 /Renaissance 
 2007 VA mixed by M.I.K.E. - London '07 (Live From The Gallery) /Avex Taiwan Inc. 
 2007 VA mixed by M.I.K.E. - London '07 (Live From The Gallery) /Armada Music

2006-04
 2006 VA mixed by DJ Lucca - Live At Hradhouse 2005 /Acapulco Records 
 2006 VA mixed by AndresAndreas - Monegros Desert Festival 12 /Florida Records 
 2006 VA mixed by Kagami - Pah /Carizma 
 2006 VA mixed by Oxa - Minimal Genial /OXA 
 2006 VA mixed by Ortin Cam - I Love Techno 2006 /PIAS 
 2006 VA mixed by Ortin Cam - I Love Techno 2006 /541
 2006 VA mixed by Lucca and Michel De Hey - Hradhouse 06 /Report Media S.R.O. 
 2006 VA mixed by Judge Jules - Judgement Sundays - The True Sound Of Ibiza /Ministry Of Sound 
 2006 VA mixed by Carl Cox - Global /Resist Music 
 2006 VA mixed by John Acquaviva - Acquaholic: The True Electro Experience /Great Stuff Rec 
 2005 VA mixed by Gayle San - U60311 Compilation Techno Division Vol. 5 /V2 Records, Inc. 
 2005 VA - Sensation 2005 - The Megamixes /Universal TV 
 2005 VA mixed by Samuel L Session - Samuel L. Session - Again On Monoid /Monoid 
 2005 VA mixed by MP - Nuts, Patrik Skoog - Audio Community 1 /Fine Audio Rec 
 2005 VA - 10 years - I Love Techno The Classics /541
 2005 VA - 10 years - I Love Techno The Classics /PIAS 
 2005 VA mixed by Eddie Halliwell, Judge Jules, Trophy Twins - Judgement Euphoria /Ministry Of Sound 
 2005 VA mixed by Joel Mull and DJ Lucca - United DJs Vol. 3 /Matrix Musik 
 2005 VA mixed by DJ Preach - Relic Mix Compilation /Relic Music 
 2005 VA mixed by Carl Cox - Carl Cox @ Space /Intec Records 
 2005 VA mixed by Fabricio Pecanha - Hypnoseries 001 /URBR – Underground Records Brasil 
 2005 VA mixed by DJ Dazzle - Forward /Mostly Recordings 
 2004 VA compiled & mixed by DJ Budai - Live - Funky Techno Roadmovie CASSETTE /Universal Music (Hungary) 
 2004 VA compiled & mixed by DJ Budai - Live - Funky Techno Roadmovie DVD /Universal Music (Hungary) 
 2004 VA compiled & mixed by DJ Budai - Live - Funky Techno Roadmovie /Universal Music (Hungary) 
 2004 VA - Ghost in the Shell Tribute Album /Miya Records 
 2004 VA - Ghost in the Shell Tribute Album /JVC Victor 
 2004 VA mixed by Christian Varela - More Favorite Tools /XXX Records 
 2004 VA mixed by Manu Kenton - Lagoa 15 /541
 2004 VA mixed by Traxster - Endangered Mixes Volume 3 - A Continuous Primate Experience /Primate Endangered Species 
 2004 VA - Sensation 2004 - The Megamixes /Universal TV 
 2004 VA compiled & mixed by Brixton - Holzplatten Zehn /ZYX Music 
 2004 VA mixed by Marko Nastic - Recyclopaedia Eclectronica /ELP Medien & Verlags GmbH 
 2004 VA mixed by Marko Nastic - Recyclopaedia Eclectronica /Recycled Loops 
 2004 VA mixed by DJ Massiv & Steve Dexter - Jump 2004 Part 3 /Jumper Records 
 2004 VA mixed by Ivan Komlinovic and Veztax - United DJs Vol. 2 /Matrix Musik 
 2004 VA mixed by Gayle San - Palazzo Volume Two /T:Classixx 
 2004 VA mixed by Marco Bailey - Ekspozicija Dve: Sindustry /Explicit Musick 
 2004 VA - Sammlung 03 /Spiel - Zeug Schallplatten 
 2004 VA mixed by The Hacker & Oxia - An Electro Mix - Box /UWe 
 2004 VA mixed by Manu Kenton - DJ Worx Manu Kenton /541
 2004 VA mixed by Benny Benassi - Subliminal Sessions 6 /Universal TV 
 2004 VA mixed by Ales Bleha - Technoclash Of Civilisation? /XMAG 
 2004 VA mixed by BK - Extreme Euphoria Volume 5 /Ministry Of Sound 
 2004 VA mixed by Marco V - Bosh Anthems Of The Year /Mixmag 
 2004 VA mixed by Adam Beyer - Essential Underground vol. 09: Stockholm /DJ - sets.com

2003
 2003 VA mixed by Carl Cox - U60311 Compilation Techno Division Vol. 3 /V2 Records Inc. 
 2003 VA mixed by Meat Katie - Destination - Australia 002 /EQ / Stomp 
 2003 VA - Godskitchen Direct /GK recordings 
 2003 VA mixed by Stanny Franssen - I Love Techno 2003 /PIAS 
 2003 VA mixed by Stanny Franssen - I Love Techno 2003 /541
 2003 VA mixed by DJ Ladida - Summer Of Love Mix /XMAG 
 2003 VA mixed by DJ Lucca - Sound Of Hradhouse Mix /XMAG 
 2003 VA mixed by Lady Helena & Tony H - Vitamina H - Fuga Da Accatrax /S.A.I.F.A.M. 
 2003 VA - 2 CDs & MP3s /NovaMute 
 2003 VA - Love Rules - The Loveparade Compilation 2003 /Blanco Y Negro 
 2003 VA mixed by James Holden - Balance 005 /EQ / Stomp 
 2003 VA mixed by Chris Liebing - Labelcompilation 1&2 /Fine Audio Recordings 
 2003 VA compiled by DJ Ghost & Youri - Cherry Moon 12 Years Anniversary /Byte Progressive 
 2003 VA mixed by Angy Dee - Rave Olympia /DJ Beat Records 
 2003 VA mixed by UMEK - DJ World Series: Techno From Slovenia /DJ Magazine 
 2003 VA mixed by Anne Savage - Music For A Harder Generation /Tidy Trax 
 2003 VA mixed by Aldrin&Jeremy Boon - Rhythm1 /Zouk Music 
 2003 VA mixed by Lady Helena & Tony H - Vitamina H - Contaminazioni Bastarde /S.A.I.F.A.M. 
 2003 VA - Electronic Hits 2003 /Independence Rec 
 2003 VA - Transcendence /Independence Rec 
 2003 VA mixed by Johan Gielen - Trance Energy 2003 - The 10th Anniversary Edition /ID&T 
 2003 VA mixed by DJ Promo - Mix > 03: ID&T Presents DJ Promo /ID&T 
 2003 VA mixed by DJ Sulo - Schranz Fusion /Edel Records (DE) 
 2003 VA compiled & mixed by DJ Newl - Technoise /Record Express 
 2003 VA mixed by UMEK - Time Warp Compilation.04 /Time - Warp 
 2003 VA mixed by John Acquaviva - From Saturday To Sunday Vol. 4 /Clubstar

2002
 2002 VA - CreamCollect Techno /Virgin Records 
 2002 VA mixed by Simon Coyle - Wetmusik Mix - Up Volume 5 - Live @ Pureflow /Wetmusik 
 2002 VA mixed by Hot X & Igor Do'urden - Hyperspace 05 /Underground Records Hungary 
 2002 VA mixed by Lady Helena & Tony - Vitamina H - Zona X CASSETTE /S.A.I.F.A.M. 
 2002 VA mixed by Lady Helena & Tony H - Vitamina H - Zona X /S.A.I.F.A.M. 
 2002 VA mixed by DJ Mellow - D - Technodrome Volume 12 /Polystar Records 
 2002 VA - Solid Sounds Anno 2002 Vol. 04 /541
 2002 VA mixed by Phil Quenum - Collaborations & Remixes 1998 - 2002 /Access 58 
 2002 VA mixed by Harry "Choo Choo" Romero - Subliminal Sessions Two /Subliminal 
 2002 VA compiled & mixed by Don Diablo - Impulz - A Different World – The Compilation /UDC 
 2002 VA mixed by unknown artist - Schranzwerk 5 /ZYX Music 
 2002 VA mixed by Marco Bailey - Gazometertraxxx Vol. 17 - Earth /XXX Records 
 2002 UMEK - Neuro /Tehnika 
 2002 VA mixed by Robert Hood - Rare Species /Logistic Records 
 2002 VA mixed by Extek - Endangered Mixes Volume 2 /Primate Endangered Species 
 2002 VA mixed by DJ Reche & Jonathan Ulysses - Space Ibiza 2002 /Neo Records Ltd. 
 2002 VA mixed by Slam - Mixer Presents Slam In America /DMC Publishing 
 2002 VA mixed by Angel Moraes & David Gausa - Seleccion Basica /Tanga Records 
 2002 VA mixed by DJ Arseniy - Techno /Zона Отрыва 
 2002 VA mixed by Alibee, Dr. Mohrle & Vinzenz - Street Move 2002 /Liquid Space 
 2002 VA - Sekaaa! /Menart 
 2002 VA mixed by Tom Wax - More Favorite Tools: Tom Wax /XXX Records 
 2002 VA compiled & mixed by Raoul & Trish van Eynde - Food Main Course /Antler - Subway 
 2002 VA mixed by Christian Weber - Five Years Of Fine Audio /Fine Audio Recordings 
 2002 VA mixed by Karol Berkley - First Take /Legend Records 
 2002 VA mixed by Traxster - Endangered Mixes Volume One /UCMG Germany 
 2002 VA mixed by Traxster - Endangered Mixes Volume One /Primate Endangered Species 
 2002 VA mixed by Christian Weber - Electronic Essence #01 /Tronic Soundz 
 2002 VA mixed by Billy Nasty - BN01 /Trust The DJ 
 2002 VA compiled & mixed by DJ Cor Fijneman - Outstanding /Black Hole Recordings 
 2002 VA - X Japan: Trance X /Universal Music (Japan) 
 2002 VA - Technosis 3 /Technosis 
 2002 VA - Recreations /Kombination Research 
 2002 VA mixed by unknown artist - Mystery Land 2002 /ID&T 
 2002 VA mixed by unknown artist - Lovefields /Purple Eye Entertainment 
 2002 VA compiled & mixed by DJ Budai - Budai 2002 (CD One) /Underground Records Hungary 
 2002 VA mixed by DJ Dan - Roundtrip /Kinetic Records 
 2002 VA mixed by Tomaz - I Love Techno 2002 /541
 2002 VA mixed by UMEK - The Torture Chamber 2 /Tortured Records 
 2002 VA mixed by Felipe & Marco Bailey - Animated Techno Soundz /Freee Magazin 
 2002 VA mixed by DJ Mellow - D - Technodrome Volume 13 /Polystar Records 
 2002 VA mixed by Judge Jules - Clubbed 2002 /Universal Music TV 
 2002 VA mixed by Marco Bailey and Miss Yetti - Essential Underground Vol. 4: Berlin / Bruxelles /DJ - sets.com 
 2002 VA mixed by Cristian Varela & Tony Verdi - Salon De Mezclas /Serial Killer Vinyl 
 2002 VA mixed by Sven Lanvin - Club System 26 /EVA Belgium

2001
 2001 VA mixed by DJ Marta - DJ Marta /Legend Records 
 2001 VA - Sammlung 2 /Spiel - Zeug Schallplatten 
 2001 VA mixed by Dave Clarke - World Service /React 
 2001 VA mixed by Sven Vath - Cocoon 2001 /Ministry (Magazine) 
 2001 VA mixed by Kazu Kimura & Simon Coyle - Sound Design /Jive Electro 
 2001 DJ One Finger - Housefucker /Nice And Firm 
 2001 VA mixed by Melrob - Techno Culture Primate Recordings /Tempo Music 
 2001 VA mixed by Melrob - Primate Recordings Limited Promotional CD /Primate Endangered Species 
 2001 VA mixed by John Thomas - Caught In The Act /Logistic Records 
 2001 VA mixed by Miss Kittin - On the Road /Terminal M 
 2001 VA mixed by Ben Long and Jamie Bissmire - The Last DJ'z On Earth /Primal Rhythms 
 2001 VA mixed by Ben Long and Jamie Bissmire - The Last DJ'z On Earth /EQ / Stomp 
 2001 VA mixed by Claude Young & DJ Rok - Essential Underground Vol. 03: Berlin / Detroit /DJ - sets.com 
 2001 VA mixed by DJ Sloop - Fantasia Revolution Tour /DJ - sets.com 
 2001 VA mixed by Gayle San - Time Warp Presents Compilation 2 /Time - Warp 
 2001 VA mixed by Daniel Miller, Howard Corner & Seth Hodder - Mute: Assume Nothing /Muzik Magazine 
 2001 VA mixed by DJ Rush & Marco Remus - Essential Underground Vol. 02: Berlin / Chicago /DJ - sets.com 
 2001 VA mixed by Dr Motte - Monster Mix CD /Proton 
 2001 VA mixed by Public Domain - Hard Dance Anthems /Warner.ESP 
 2001 VA mixed by Traxster - Techno Energy 12 /Nextera 
 2001 VA mixed by Charles Siegling - PLUS: Technasia: Charles Siegling /Plus 
 2001 VA mixed by Michael Burkat - Fine Audio DJ Mix Series Vol. 5: Michael Burkat /Fine Audio Recordings 
 2001 VA compiled & mixed by Ian Void - Terra Firma /Geushky 
 2001 VA - Technosis 2 /Technosis 
 2001 VA mixed by unknown artist - Schranzwerk 4 /ZYX Music 
 2001 VA mixed by Valentino Kanzyani - Rock the Discothèque /Matrix Musik 
 2001 VA mixed by Arjan Rietvink Productions - ID&T Techno /ID&T 
 2001 VA mixed by Frank T.R.A.X. - Trance Techno T.R.A.X. 3 /Tempo Music 
 2001 VA compiled & mixed by Dan Von Schulz - Music Lunch /Record Express 
 2001 VA mixed by DJ La Monde - Bionom - Monoid 2nd Label Compilation /Monoid 
 2001 VA compiled & mixed by Justin Robertson - Imprint /Distinct'ive Records 
 2001 VA mixed by Mauro Picotto - Maximal.FM Compilation Vol. 2 /Media Records 
 2001 VA mixed by Mauro Picotto - Maximal.FM Compilation Vol. 2 /BXR Benelux 
 2001 VA compiled & mixed by DJ Eric Denz Da Denz - Nu Teqdenz /Black Hole Recordings 
 2001 VA mixed by Nils Hess - The Sound Of Eukatech 5 /Eukatech 
 2001 VA compiled & mixed by DJ Promiss - Promiss - II: Wake Up Call /Basic Beat Recordings 
 2001 VA - Wetmusik Presents Prime Time /Prime Time 
 2001 VA mixed by Dave Angel - DA01 /Trust The DJ 
 2001 VA - Concept Techno 2.0 /Hardware 
 2001 VA mixed by Kelly D - 4 Elements - An Essential Dance Gathering /Influx 
 2001 VA - Tekno! 19 /Popron Music 
 2001 VA - Italo 2001 Fresh Hits Volume 4 /ZYX Music 
 2001 Santos - Camels /Plus Recordings 
 2001 Santos - Camels /Phat Puppy Rec 
 2001 VA - Kobayashi 010 Limited /Kobayashi Rec 
 2001 VA mixed by Oxia - Vital Sessions /Human 
 2001 VA - DJ Maus - Cream CD3 /Yul Records 
 2001 VA mixed by Baby Bee, DJ Prinz & Smos - Cafe D'Anvers Presents Free Vibes & Saturdays /Discomatic 
 2001 VA mixed by W. Jorg Henze - Selected & Connected Tracks by W. Jörg Henze /Spiel - Zeug Schallplatten 
 2001 VA mixed by Melrob - Hard Techno /SPV Poland / Big Blue 
 2001 VA mixed by David Cabeza, Miguel Serna & Nacho Division - DJ's En Directo Vol. 2 /Contrasena Records 
 2001 VA mixed by Stryke - Advance /Max Music & Entertainment Inc. 
 2001 VA compiled by Carson Plug - Vinyl Surgery - Frequenz Berater /d.Drum 
 2001 VA compiled & mixed by Christian Smith - Tronic Treatment /Tronic 
 2001 VA compiled & mixed by Christian Smith - Tronic Treatment /Hardware 
 2001 VA compiled & mixed by Christian Smith - Tronic Treatment /Moonshine Music 
 2001 VA - Tehnika 1 /Tehnika 
 2001 VA compiled by DJ Calle Dernulf - En Linje - Calle Dernulf Samlar Techno /EMI Records (UK) 
 2001 VA mixed by Sidereal - Darkhouz & Popotronic /Satellite K 
 2001 VA mixed by DJ Ricardinho NS - Club Bunker /Sygno Music 
 2001 VA mixed by unknown artist - Electrocuted Presents Sexmachinemusic / Groovetechnology v1.2 /Groovetech Records 
 2001 VA mixed by Mistress Barbara - Relentless Beats Vol. 1 /Moonshine Music

2000
 2000 VA - Illegal Techno 2000 /Cyber Production 
 2000 VA - Aktive Matrix /Matrix Musik 
 2000 VA mixed by Mas Ricardo - OXA House Vol. 5 /OXA 
 2000 VA mixed by Simon Digby & Will E Tell - Wetmusik Mix - Up Volume 2 - Live @ Storey Hall /Wetmusik 
 2000 VA compiled & mixed by DJ Budai - Techno - Logic Vol. 1 /Universal Records 
 2000 VA mixed by WJ Henze - DJ's Homebase III /Federation Of Drums 
 2000 VA mixed by Felix Da Housecat & Justin Robertson - Bugged Out! 01 /Virgin Records 
 2000 VA mixed by Ian Void - Geushky: This Is The Colour We Are /Geushky 
 2000 VA mixed by unknown artist - Larm 3 /H&G Records 
 2000 VA mixed by Peter Pan - DJ Traxx 01 - Peter Pan /Klangwerk 
 2000 VA mixed by Oliver Lieb - Phuture Tech Trance Volume 1 /Phoolish Records 
 2000 VA mixed by Richard McNeill - Hardware #05 /Hardware 
 2000 VA mixed by Brenda Russell - Biosphere Vol. 2 - Brenda Russell /Event Records 
 2000 Santos - Camels /Ultra Records 
 2000 Santos - Camels /FLEX Records (DK) 
 2000 VA mixed by Elex Red, vocals by MC Spot - Voice And Beats - MC Spot /XXX Records 
 2000 VA mixed by Simon Digby & Will E Tell - Wetmusik Mix - Up Volume 1 - Live @ Storey Hall /Wetmusik 
 2000 VA - Schranz + Schredder – Techno Underground /Warner Special Marketing GmbH 
 2000 VA - Sammlung 1 /Spiel - Zeug Schallplatten 
 2000 VA mixed by Slam - Past Lessons / Future Theories /Distinct'ive Breaks Records 
 2000 VA compiled & mixed by Richard McNeill - Richie Rich - Hardware #06 /Hardware 
 2000 VA - Bio Molecular Rhythms Vol. 2 /Molecular Rec 
 2000 VA mixed by Massimo - At The Wheels Of Steel /Galvanic 
 2000 VA mixed by DJ Tonio - A 100% Techno Therapy /Model Records 
 2000 VA compiled by Olaf Pozsgay, mixed by F.L.X. - Plastic Meltdown Two /Luxus 
 2000 VA mixed by Plank - In Case Of... Plank /Harthouse 
 2000 Tiga - Montreal Mix Sessions Vol. 5 - Mixed Emotions /Turbo 
 2000 Tiga - Montreal Mix Sessions Vol. 5 - Mixed Emotions /Turbo 
 2000 VA - Elektrotehnika Slavenika /Wire Magazine 
 2000 VA live mix by Carl Cox - Mixed Live: Crobar Nightclub, Chicago /Moonshine Music 
 2000 VA mixed by Nick Warren - Global Underground 018: Amsterdam /Boxed 
 2000 VA mixed by Nick Warren - Global Underground 018: Amsterdam /Boxed 
 2000 VA - X - Club - 5th Anniversary /Zona Musica 
 2000 VA mixed by Billy Nasty - The Torture Chamber /Tortured Records 
 2000 VA mixed by Steve Mason - In the Mix Volume 6 /Experience Grooves

1999
 1999 VA - Acid Drops Vol. 1 /Nova Tekk 
 1999 VA - Acid Drops Vol. 1 /Cameleon 
 1999 VA mixed by Warmduscher - Techno Attack Volume Two /Warner Special Marketing GmbH 
 1999 VA mixed by Delta 9 - Delta 9 vs. Delta 9 Volume 2 /Pure Acid Mixtapes 
 1999 VA mixed by Jay Vidies - The Techno Life 1 /Play It Loud (Netherlands) 
 1999 VA compiled & mixed by Christian Weber - Audiophonic Volume 2 /Fine Audio Recordings 
 1999 VA - Illegal Techno 6 /Cyber Production 
 1999 VA mixed by Eric Powell & Will E Tell - Hardware DJ Series 001 /Hardware 
 1999 VA mixed by UMEK - UMEK On Monoid /Monoid 
 1999 VA - Bio Molecular Rhythms Vol. 1 /Molecular Recordings 
 1999 VA compiled & mixed by Chris Liebing - U60311 Compilation Techno Division Vol.1 /V2 Records, Inc. 
 1999 VA mixed by Tony Rios - DJ's Homebase II /Federation Of Drums 
 1999 VA mixed by Thomas Schumacher - Perlen 1 /Spiel - Zeug Schallplatten 
 1999 VA compiled & mixed by Leandro Gamez - This Is For You /Neuton 
 1999 VA mixed by Richard Summerhayes - Sound of Eukatech 3 /Eukatech 
 1999 VA mixed by Dave Clarke - Fuse presents Dave Clarke /Music Man Records 
 1999 VA mixed by Chris Liebing - Audio Compilation Vol. 2 /Fine Audio Rec 
 1999 VA - Compilation For Medical Aid In Kosovo /Kobayashi Rec 
 1999 VA mixed by DJ Manon - Super Girls /TBA 
 1998 VA mixed by Commander Tom - Commander Tom - In The Mix III /Noom Records 
 1998 VA - Covert Operations /Planet Rhythm Rec 
 1998 VA mixed by DJ Misjah - X - Trax Extreme /DMC Records, Inc. 
 1998 VA compiled by DJ Taurus - Tunnel Red Light 5 /Red Light 
 1998 VA - The Best Of X - Trax The 2nd Compilation /X - Trax 
 1997 UMEK - Audio /ZET 
 1997 VA - Docklands - A State Of Mind Vol. 1 /Lyrical Robot Rec 
 1996 VA mixed by Westbam - Mayday - Life On Mars – The Mayday Compilation Album /Low Spirit Recordings 
 1996 VA compiled by Mr. Oz & DJ Yaco, mixed by DJ Yaco - Immortality - Volume 2 /Mercury

Further reading
Interviews
 Umek 2009 interview  Laptoprockers

References

External links
 Official website
 Discogs - Umek

Electronic music discographies
Discographies of Slovak artists